Edward Elgar's Enigma Variations has received more than sixty recordings since the first version, recorded under the baton of the composer in 1924. The first two recordings were made by the old acoustic process. Following the introduction of the microphone and electrical recording in 1925, Elgar re-recorded the work, taking advantage of the greatly increased realism of the new process. New recordings of the Variations were later made following the introduction of the long playing record in the early 1950s, and after the introduction of stereophonic recording towards the end of the decade. Details of the recordings, below, are taken from The Gramophone.

Notes

Discographies of classical compositions
Recordings of Edward Elgar